{{DISPLAYTITLE:C14H28}}
The molecular formula C14H28 (molar mass: 196.37 g/mol, exact mass: 196.2191 u) may refer to:

 Cyclotetradecane
 Tetradecene

Molecular formulas